Congregation Beth Am ("People's House") is a Reform Synagogue in Los Altos Hills, California. It is a member of the Union for Reform Judaism. Beth Am has a sister congregation in Poltava, Ukraine, also known as Beth Am. Beth Am has a program aimed at helping emigrant families from the former Soviet Union. Two congregation members have won Nobel Prizes.

References

External links
 Beth Am website

Ashkenazi Jewish culture in California
Reform synagogues in California
Ukrainian-American culture in California
Ukrainian-Jewish culture in the United States